Marc Lammers (born 15 March 1969 in Oss, North Brabant) is a Dutch former field hockey player and head coach. In the past, he led the Spanish women's national team from 1999 to 2000 and the Dutch women's national team from 2000 to 2008. Under his guidance, the Dutch team won the silver medal at the 2004 Summer Olympics in Athens, Greece, and gold at the 2008 Summer Olympics in Beijing, China. Later he also coached the Belgian men's national team until 2014, with whom he became European vice-champion. As a player, he earned five caps for the men's team. Lammers played for sixteen years in the Netherlands' first division, Hoofdklasse, with HC Den Bosch, HC Tilburg and Oranje Zwart.

Achievements as Dutch coach
 2001 Champions Trophy – Silver
 2002 Champions Trophy – Bronze
 2002 World Cup – Silver
 2003 European Nations Cup – Gold
 2003 Champions Trophy – Bronze
 2004 Summer Olympics – Silver
 2004 Champions Trophy – Gold
 2005 European Nations Cup – Gold
 2005 Champions Trophy – Gold
 2006 Champions Trophy – Bronze
 2006 World Cup – Gold
 2007 Champions Trophy – Gold
 2008 Champions Trophy – Bronze
 2008 Summer Olympics – Gold

Achievements as Belgian coach
• 2013 European Nations Cup – Silver

External links
 Personal website

1969 births
Living people
Dutch male field hockey players
Dutch field hockey coaches
National team coaches
Sportspeople from Oss
HC Den Bosch players
Spanish Olympic coaches